Amsterdam Basketball was a Dutch professional basketball club from the city of Amsterdam, established in 1995 and dissolved in 2011. The club won the Dutch championship seven times and the Dutch Cup five times.

History

Early years (1995–1997)
After it was announced that the Graydons Canadians, a team from Amsterdam would not participate in the Eredivisie of 1995–96, Ed de Haas, Carlo Brunink and Oscar Kales founded the club. The club immediately started playing in the highest division in the Netherlands, and was named Finish Profiles Amsterdam after the new main sponsor. In the first season Tyrone Marionneaux was the head coach and Finish Profiles ended on a 9th place.

In the 1996–97 Jan Willem Jansen became head coach and new players like Mario Bennes were acquired, which led to the team winning the NBB Cup and reaching the league Finals. The club also played for the first season with the name Amsterdam Astronauts, which referred to the home arena of the club, the Apollohal.

First European games and Dutch titles (1997–2002)

In 1997–98 the club debuted in Europe and started a second team, that would play in the Promotiedivisie. From that point some good years for the club began, as one of the all-time great coaches in Dutch basketball history Ton Boot started coaching the team. In the 1998–99 season the club won its first Dutch championship and reached the semifinals of the Korać Cup, in which it lost to Racing Basket Paris. In that semifinals the team played against later NBA All-Star Tony Parker.
In the 2000–01 season the 3rd straight Dutch title was one.
Before the 2001–02 season the club moved to Sporthallen Zuid, which had a capacity of 3,000. Another championship was won in the Sporthallen. The club had a tough season the following year, as newly formed EiffelTowers Nijmegen took the trophies.

Golden Years (2003–2009)

In the 2003–04, season Israeli head coach Arik Shivek became head coach of Amsterdam, and some memorable players were acquired in Joe Spinks, Mario Bennes (who played earlier with the club), Chris McGuthrie and Teddy Gipson. The club also got a new main sponsor in Demon and was renamed Demon Astronauts. 
In 2004–05, the fifth national title was won, after Amsterdam beat Landstede Basketbal 4–0 in the Finals.

In 2005–06 and 2006–07, Amsterdam played as the Amsterdam Astronauts and ended in the 2nd and 6th places in the Eredivisie.

In May 2007, businessman Roel Pieper got the job of chairman of the club. MyGuide became the new main sponsor of the club. In 2008–09 and 2009–10, the club won their sixth and seventh titles, both by beating EiffelTowers Den Bosch 4–3 in the Finals. Also, captain Peter van Paassen won the league MVP award in both seasons.

Even though Amsterdam won their 2009 title on May 31, they had to wait till June 15 to officially get their title. Amsterdam player Orien Greene had used cannabis, but because the letter to inform the club never arrived the club got to keep their title.

To add to the turmoil, both main sponsors of the club (MyGuide and Eclipse-Jet) went bankrupt, so the team played without a sponsor in the 2009–10 season.

Rebuilding and disappearance (2009–2011)
The team was renamed ABC Amsterdam. The team, led by domestic players as DBL All-Stars Jessey Voorn, Dimeo van der Horst and Ramon Siljade did manage to reach the Playoffs in the 2009–10 and 2010–11 seasons.

The team was dissolved on August 11, 2011, after it couldn't find a main sponsor that was willing to invest enough money to keep the club in the DBL. For the first time since the foundation of the Eredivisie, no team from Amsterdam played in the league. In the 2012–13 season, BC Apollo entered as new team from Amsterdam.

Sponsorships names
1995–1997: Finish Profiles Amsterdam 
1997–2003: Ricoh Astronauts 
2003–2006: Demon Ricoh Astronauts 
2006–2007: Amsterdam Astronauts
2007–2009: MyGuide Amsterdam
2009–2010: EclipseJet-MyGuide Amsterdam
2010–2011: ABC Amsterdam

Honours

Domestic competitions
Dutch League 
 Winners (7): 1998–99, 1999–00, 2000–01, 2001–02, 2004–05, 2007–08, 2008–09
Dutch Cup
 Winners (5): 1996–97, 1997–98, 1998–99, 2003–04, 2005–06

European competitions
FIBA Korać Cup
 Semi-finalist (1): 2000-01

Season by season

Notable players

To appear in this section a player must have either: played at least one season for the club, set a club record or won an individual award while at the club, played at least one official international match for their national team at any time or performed very successfully during period in the club or at later/previous stages of his career.

 Chris McGuthrie (1998–2003)
 Joe Spinks (1998–2006)
 Tony Miller (2001–02, 2003–04)
 Ramon Siljade (2005–11)
 Avis Wyatt (2007–09)
 Stefan Wessels (2004–09)
 Peter van Paassen (2005–09)
 Orien Greene (2008–09)
 Teddy Gipson (2003–06, 2007–09)
 Patrick Sanders (2010)
 Jessey Voorn (2007–11)
 Dimeo van der Horst (2007–11)
 Sergio de Randamie (2007–11)

References

Defunct basketball teams in the Netherlands
Former Dutch Basketball League teams
Basketball teams established in 1995
1995 establishments in the Netherlands
Basketball teams disestablished in 2011
2011 disestablishments in the Netherlands
Sports clubs in Amsterdam